Sylwia Szczerbińska (born 11 October 1997) is a Polish sprint canoeist.

She participated at the 2018 ICF Canoe Sprint World Championships.

References

External links
 

1997 births
Living people
Polish female canoeists
ICF Canoe Sprint World Championships medalists in Canadian
European Games competitors for Poland
Canoeists at the 2019 European Games
21st-century Polish women